The Little Red River is an intermittent stream about  long, formed at the confluence of the North Prong and South Prong Little Red River in Briscoe County, Texas, and flowing east-northeastward to join the Prairie Dog Town Fork Red River in Hall County, Texas.

Geography
The upper tributaries of the Little Red River are ephemeral streams known as the North Prong and South Prong Red River. Both streams originate along the eastern Caprock Escarpment of the Llano Estacado in Briscoe County, Texas, and flow through Caprock Canyons State Park. The North Prong flows to the north and the South Prong passes to the south of Haynes Ridge, a landmark feature of Caprock Canyons.

The Little Red River initially runs eastward across Briscoe County and then turns northeastward as it approaches the Hall County line.  The stream then continues in an easterly direction across sparsely populated ranch country of Hall County before merging with the Prairie Dog Town Fork Red River.

Overall, the Little Red River and its tributaries descend  from its headwaters to its confluence with the Prairie Dog Town Fork, passing through flat to moderately steep terrain along its course.

See also
Salt Fork Red River
Palo Duro Canyon
Washita River
Pease River
Quitaque Creek
Double Mountain Fork Brazos River
List of rivers of Texas

References

External links

Rivers of Texas
Tributaries of the Red River of the South
Rivers of Briscoe County, Texas
Rivers of Hall County, Texas